Hallrule is a hamlet on the B6357 road, in the Scottish Borders area of Scotland, on the Rule Water, near Abbotrule, Bedrule Bonchester Bridge, Denholm, Hobkirk, Ruletownhead and to the south, the Wauchope Forest.
The village's name in 1502 was Hawroull, and Hallrule Tower was held by George Turnbull. It was burned in 1523 and in 1544.

See also
List of places in the Scottish Borders
List of places in Scotland
List of Scottish feudal baronies

References

External links
RCAHMS: Hallrule, Cairn, cinerary urn
RCAHMS: Hallrule, Tower House, village
CANMORE/RCAHMS: Hallrule
Hallrule House and Hallrule Estate
Farming Scotland: Sheep farming at Hallrule Farm
Branxholme Gun dogs: Keepers Day at Hallrule estate

Villages in the Scottish Borders